Roberto Gómez, Roberto Goméz or Roberto Gomez is the name of:

Roberto Suárez Goméz (1932–2000), Bolivian drug trafficker
Roberto Carlos Mario Gómez (born 1957), Argentine football manager and former football player
Roberto Gómez Bolaños, (1929-2014) Mexican writer, actor, director
Roberto Goméz (baseball) (born 1989), Dominican Republic baseball player
Roberto Gomez (pool player) (born 1978), Filipino pocket billiards player
Roberto Goméz (swimmer) (born 1988), Venezuelan swimmer